Harry Tañamor (born August 20, 1977) is an amateur boxer from Zamboanga City, Philippines best known to medal repeatedly on the world stage at light flyweight.

Career
The southpaw is competing in the Light Flyweight (– 48 kg) division, and won bronze medals at the 2001 World Amateur Boxing Championships and 2003 World Amateur Boxing Championships.
He competed at the 2004 Summer Olympics, but was knocked off in the round of 16 by Hong Moo-Won of South Korea. He qualified for the Athens Games by ending up in second place in the 2nd AIBA Asian 2004 Olympic Qualifying Tournament in Karachi, Pakistan, behind Hong Moo-Won.

At the 2007 World Amateur Boxing Championships in Chicago he defeated local hero Luis Yanez but lost to favorite Zou Shiming in the final.

Tañamor competed in the 2008 Summer Olympics in Beijing, entering in the light flyweight class. He was the only Filipino athlete predicted to win a medal by Sports Illustrated's Olympic Preview issue. However, he was defeated by Manyo Plange of Ghana in the Round of 32, 6 to 3.

At the 2008 Boxing World Cup, Tañamor defeated Yampier Hernández of Cuba in the light flyweight final to win the gold.

References

External links
 Profile on CBS
 

1977 births
Living people
Olympic boxers of the Philippines
Boxers at the 2004 Summer Olympics
Boxers at the 2008 Summer Olympics
Asian Games medalists in boxing
Boxers at the 2002 Asian Games
Filipino male boxers
Sportspeople from Zamboanga City
AIBA World Boxing Championships medalists
Asian Games silver medalists for the Philippines
Medalists at the 2002 Asian Games
Southeast Asian Games medalists in boxing
Southeast Asian Games gold medalists for the Philippines
Competitors at the 2005 Southeast Asian Games
Light-flyweight boxers